Daphnella sabrina is a species of sea snail, a marine gastropod mollusk in the family Raphitomidae.

Description
The length of the shell attains 5 mm, its diameter 3 mm.

The delicate, white, ovate-fusiform shell is extremely highly sculptured, with many oblique, spiral carinae (two at the antepenultimate whorl, three at the penultimate and five at the body whorl), one being especially conspicuous at the periphery. The cross cancellations are pronounced and fine. The shell contains eight whorls. The 3-4 apical whorls are ochreous and minutely decussate, the subsequent whorls are impressed at the suture. The wide aperture is ovate. The siphonal canal is short. The outer lip is thin. The columella stands almost upright. The sinus is wide and not deep.

Distribution
This species occurs in the Gulf of Oman.

References

 Bonfitto, A., Sabelli, B. & Morassi, M. (2001) Austrodaphnella yemenensis new species (Gastropoda: Turridae) from Yemen, Red Sea, with notes on A. alcestis (Melvill, 1906). The Nautilus, 115, 84–89

External links
 

sabrina
Gastropods described in 1906